The Judas of Tyrol is a 1933 German historical drama film directed by Franz Osten and starring Fritz Rasp, Camilla Spira, and Marianne Hoppe. It was shot at the Johannisthal Studios in Berlin. The film's sets were designed by the art director Hans Jacoby. Its Berlin premiere was at the Marmorhaus.

Synopsis 
The film is set in the early nineteenth century, when the Tyrol was under foreign occupation. The Tyrolean folk hero Andreas Hofer hides in the village of St Leonhardt, whose residents are preparing to stage their annual Passion Play. The film focuses on Raffl, a young farmhand cast in the role of Judas. Raffl gradually loses the ability to distinguish between role and reality.

Cast

See also
Raffl (1984)

References

Bibliography
 
 Klaus, Ulrich J. Deutsche Tonfilme: Jahrgang 1933. Klaus-Archiv, 1988.

External links

1933 films
1930s historical drama films
German historical drama films
Films of Nazi Germany
1930s German-language films
Films directed by Franz Osten
German films based on plays
Films set in the Alps
Napoleonic Wars films
Tobis Film films
German black-and-white films
1933 drama films
1930s German films
Films shot at Johannisthal Studios